Butrón is a castle located in Gatika, in the province of Biscay, in northern Spain.

Butrón or Butron may also refer to:

Butrón River,  Basque Country, Spain
, noble feudal family of the Crown of Castile
Butrón (surname)
Butron Media Corporation, Arkansas, United States

See also
 Burton (disambiguation)